Aude Luquet (born 18 August 1967) is a French politician representing the Democratic Movement. She was elected to the French National Assembly on 18 June 2017, representing the department of Seine-et-Marne.

Luquet was a councilor in Melun commune before her election to the Assembly.

References

1967 births
Living people
Deputies of the 15th National Assembly of the French Fifth Republic
Women members of the National Assembly (France)
Democratic Movement (France) politicians
21st-century French women politicians
People from Melun
Politicians from Île-de-France
Deputies of the 16th National Assembly of the French Fifth Republic